Bonamy Price (22 May 18078 January 1888) was a British political economist.

Biography
Price was born at Saint Peter Port, Guernsey, where he lived until age 14, when he left Guernsey and entered the tutelage of Reverend Charles Bradley in High Wycombe. He entered at Worcester College, Oxford, in 1825, where he received double first in classics in 1829. During his time at Worcester College, he was occasionally studied under Thomas Arnold, at Laleham; who went on to become head master of Rugby School, and offered Price a role as assistant master of mathematics at the school, where he remained from 1830 until 1850. Price married Lydia Rose, daughter of Joseph Rose who was the vicar at Rothley, on 18 December 1934.

In 1868 Price was elected Drummond Professor of Political Economy at Oxford, and was thrice re-elected to the post, which he held till his death. U.S. Senator from Missouri Carl Schurz quoted extensively from one of Price's treatises during his Senate speech of 14 January 1874. He was in charge of Economics Department at the 1878 National Association for the Promotion of Social Science congress at Cheltenham, as well as the 1882 congress at Nottingham. In 1883 he was elected an honorary fellow of his college. In addition to his professorial work, he was in much request as a popular lecturer on political economy.  Price was also a member of Royal Commission on Agricultural Depression & Commission on the Depression of Trade and Commerce.

Price became ill in February 1886 and his health declined; he moved from Oxford to London for treatment until his death. His daughter Bertha married Daniel Conner Lathbury.

Works
Principles of Political Economy (1878)
Concerning Currency and Banking (1876)
Practical Political Economy (1878)

References

External links
 Page with additional bio info and genealogy

British economists
1807 births
1888 deaths
Guernsey people
Alumni of Worcester College, Oxford
Drummond Professors of Political Economy